Šentjernej ( or ; in older sources also Šent Jernej) is a small town in southeastern Slovenia. It is the seat of the Municipality of Šentjernej. It lies in the center of the Šentjernej Plain, which is part of the larger Krka Flat. The area is part of the traditional region of Lower Carniola. It is now included in the Southeast Slovenia Statistical Region.

Church
The parish church, from which the town also gets its name, is dedicated to Saint Bartholomew and belongs to the Roman Catholic Diocese of Novo Mesto. It is a Baroque building with remains of two earlier churches, one Romanesque from the 12th century and the other a 15th-century Gothic one, preserved in the floor of the current building. Two 18th-century side altars were brought to the church from the Cistercian monastery at Kostanjevica.

Twin towns — sister cities
Šentjernej is twinned with:

  Břeclav, Czech Republic

References

External links
Šentjernej on Geopedia

Populated places in the Municipality of Šentjernej